Honduras competed in the Winter Olympic Games for the first time (and as of 2022, the only time) at the 1992 Winter Olympics in Albertville, France.

Cross-country skier Jenny Palacios-Stillo was Honduras' only athlete in Albertville, competing in three events: the 15 km classical, the 5 km classical pursuit and the 10 km free pursuit. Palacios placed last (50th, 62nd and 58th, respectively, all by wide margins) among the competitors who finished the three events; however, since she did finish all three, Jenny placed ahead of skiers who did not, and thus avoided coming in dead last. "It is the first time that a skier of Honduras takes part in the Olympics," Palacios said afterwards. "Me, I finished the race whereas there are girls who have more experience than I which did not pass the finishing line."

Competitors
The following is the list of number of competitors in the Games.

Cross-country skiing

Women

2 Starting delay based on 5 km results. 
C = Classical style, F = Freestyle

References

Official Olympic Reports
 Olympic Winter Games 1992, full results by sports-reference.com

Nations at the 1992 Winter Olympics
W
1992